Ballistarius (plural ballistarii) were infantrymen, serving as artillerymen of the Roman army who handled ballistae. They were classed as immunes, exempt from fatigue duty of entrenching or building.

Notes

See also
 List of Roman army unit types

Military units and formations of ancient Rome